The eighth edition of Dancing Stars was broadcast from March 1 to May 17, 2013 on ORF1 and was presented by Mirjam Weichselbraun and Klaus Eberhartinger.

Couples

Scoring chart

Highest and lowest scoring performances of the series 
The best and worst performances in each dance according to the judges' marks are as follows:

Average chart

Average dance chart

Dance order

Week 1 

Individual judges' scores in charts below (given in parentheses) are listed in this order from left to right: Balazs Ekker, Nicole Burns-Hansen, Thomas Schäfer-Elmayer and Hannes Nedbal.

Week 2 

Individual judges' scores in charts below (given in parentheses) are listed in this order from left to right: Balazs Ekker, Nicole Burns-Hansen, Thomas Schäfer-Elmayer and Hannes Nedbal.

Week 3: "Aus für Katharina Gutensohn" 

Individual judges' scores in charts below (given in parentheses) are listed in this order from left to right: Balazs Ekker, Nicole Burns-Hansen, Thomas Schäfer-Elmayer and Hannes Nedbal.

Week 4: "Aus für Doris Schretzmayer" 

Individual judges' scores in charts below (given in parentheses) are listed in this order from left to right: Balazs Ekker, Nicole Burns-Hansen, Thomas Schäfer-Elmayer and Hannes Nedbal.

Week 5: "Aus für Rudi Roubinek" 

Individual judges' scores in charts below (given in parentheses) are listed in this order from left to right: Balazs Ekker, Nicole Burns-Hansen, Thomas Schäfer-Elmayer and Hannes Nedbal.

Week 6: "Aus für Gerald Pichowetz" 

Individual judges' scores in charts below (given in parentheses) are listed in this order from left to right: Balazs Ekker, Nicole Burns-Hansen, Thomas Schäfer-Elmayer and Hannes Nedbal.

Week 7: "Aus für Monika Salzer" 

Individual judges' scores in charts below (given in parentheses) are listed in this order from left to right: Balazs Ekker, Nicole Burns-Hansen, Thomas Schäfer-Elmayer and Hannes Nedbal.

Week 8: "Aus für Gregor Glanz" 

Individual judges' scores in charts below (given in parentheses) are listed in this order from left to right: Balazs Ekker, Nicole Burns-Hansen, Thomas Schäfer-Elmayer and Hannes Nedbal.

Week 9: "Aus für Biko Botowamungu" 

Individual judges' scores in charts below (given in parentheses) are listed in this order from left to right: Balazs Ekker, Nicole Burns-Hansen, Thomas Schäfer-Elmayer and Hannes Nedbal.

Week 10: "Aus für Susanna Hirschler" 

Individual judges' scores in charts below (given in parentheses) are listed in this order from left to right: Balazs Ekker, Nicole Burns-Hansen, Thomas Schäfer-Elmayer and Hannes Nedbal.

Week 11: "Aus für Angelika Ahrens" 

Individual judges' scores in charts below (given in parentheses) are listed in this order from left to right: Balazs Ekker, Nicole Burns-Hansen, Thomas Schäfer-Elmayer and Hannes Nedbal.

Week 12: "Das Finale" 

Individual judges' scores in charts below (given in parentheses) are listed in this order from left to right: Balazs Ekker, Nicole Burns-Hansen, Thomas Schäfer-Elmayer and Hannes Nedbal.

Call-out order
The table below lists the order in which the contestants' fates were revealed. The order of the safe couples doesn't reflect the viewer voting results.

 This couple came in first place with the judges.
 This couple came in last place with the judges.
 This couple came in last place with the judges and was eliminated.
 This couple was eliminated.
 This couple won the competition.
 This couple came in second in the competition.

Dance chart

 Highest scoring dance
 Lowest scoring dance

References
Official website of Dancing Stars

Season 08
2013 Austrian television seasons